Lennox Pawle (27 April 1872, in Marylebone, Middlesex – 22 February 1936, in Los Angeles, California) was an English stage and film actor.

Life and career 
John Lennox Pawle was born in Marylebone, London, on 27 April 1872, the son of John Christopher Pawle, a London solicitor, and his wife, Maria. Before becoming an actor Pawle worked as a newspaper reporter; later he began his acting career at Sarah Thorne’s Dramatic School. The heavyset actor gained experience in London, where before the turn of the century he was already known as a comic actor and eventually became a member of Maude Adams's Playhouse company. Pawle arrived in America in 1910 and worked at the Broadway Theatre, where he acted in five plays. He married Dorothy Parker when they returned to England in 1914. It was Pawle’s second (possibly third) marriage after being granted a divorce from Janet Mary Pawle in 1909. Lennox Pawle remained in England during the years of the First World War but returned to Broadway in 1919 to play in Messager's operetta Monsieur Beaucaire. He also appeared in some silent films.

Pawle remained busy on Broadway throughout the 1920s and made his return to movies in 1929. He played in a handful of Hollywood movies during the 1930s and is possibly best known to modern audiences as Mr. Dick in George Cukor's literature adaption David Copperfield (1935). Lennox Pawle died one year after the film was released.

Filmography

References

External links
 
 

1872 births
1936 deaths
English male film actors
English male silent film actors
Male actors from London
20th-century English male actors
British expatriate male actors in the United States